Archanes–Asterousia is a municipality in Heraklion regional unit, Crete, Greece. The seat of the municipality is the village Peza. The municipality has an area of 337.137 km2.

Municipality
The municipality Archanes–Asterousia was formed at the 2011 local government reform by the merger of the following 3 former municipalities, that became municipal units:
Archanes
Asterousia
Nikos Kazantzakis

References

Municipalities of Crete
Populated places in Heraklion (regional unit)